Dávid Kolozár (born August 3, 1981) is a Hungarian former swimmer who specialized in butterfly events. He is a former varsity swimmer for the Arizona State Sun Devils, and a graduate of tourism and business at the Arizona State University in Tempe, Arizona.

Kolozar qualified for the men's 200 m butterfly at the 2004 Summer Olympics in Athens, by clearing a FINA B-standard entry time of 1:58.99 from the national championships in Székesfehérvár. He challenged seven other swimmers on the fourth heat, including Olympic veterans Takashi Yamamoto of Japan and Franck Esposito of France. He edged out Peru's Juan Pablo Valdivieso to take a seventh spot by less than 0.10 of a second in 2:01.89. Kolozar failed to advance into the semifinals, as he placed twenty-fifth overall in the preliminaries.

References

External links
Player Bio – Arizona State Sun Devils

1981 births
Living people
Hungarian male swimmers
Olympic swimmers of Hungary
Swimmers at the 2004 Summer Olympics
Male butterfly swimmers
Arizona State Sun Devils men's swimmers
Swimmers from Budapest
20th-century Hungarian people
21st-century Hungarian people